Peter of Jerusalem was the Patriarch of Jerusalem from 524 to 544. He held to the Chalcedonian belief. 

Patriarch Peter, as John III's successor and following in his Chalcedonian position, convened in September 536 a synod in Jerusalem in which he proclaimed his orthodoxy and adherence to the Council of Chalcedon. He agreed in the deposition of Anthimus I, the Monophysite patriarch of Constantinople who was deposed that year. 

In 544, emperor Justinian issued an edict condemning Theodore of Mopsuestia, Theoderet of Cyrrhus, and Ive of Edessa, who supposedly were Nestorians, but who were never excommunicated and who had died in the fifth century. Peter signed the edict but included a proviso that if it would not be signed by the Pope of Rome, his signature would be invalid. Eventually, the emperor forced the Pope sign the edict.  

Patriarch Peter died in 544.

References

6th-century patriarchs of Jerusalem
Year of birth unknown